Marhamat (also: Marxamat) is a district of Andijan Region in Uzbekistan. The capital lies at the city Marhamat.

The district consists of 1 city (Marhamat), 10 urban-type settlements (Polvontosh, Boboxuroson, Qorabogʻish, Qoraqoʻrgʻon, Koʻtarma, Marxamat, Rovot, Oʻqchi, Xakka and Xoʻjaariq) and 5 rural communities.

References

Districts of Uzbekistan
Andijan Region